Eleanor Barnes is a British physician at the John Radcliffe Hospital and a Professor of Hepatology and Experimental Medicine at the University of Oxford. She has studied hepatitis C and the development of the development of HCV vaccines. She is a Fellow of the Academy of Medical Sciences and serves as the lead for hepatology at the National Institute for Health Research (NIHR) Clinical Research Network.

Early life and education 
Barnes has said that she was interested in science as a child. She decided to study medicine at university, and eventually trained at St Bartholomew's Hospital. She completed an intercalated bachelor's degree in anthropology and philosophy. After graduating, she worked as a medical resident at the Royal Free Hospital, where she decided to specialise in hepatology and gastroenterology. Determined to pursue a career in research, Barnes worked unpaid for three months, during which time she obtained data that she used to apply for a fellowship from the Medical Research Council. She was a doctoral researcher at the University of Oxford. Her doctoral research considered T cell and dendritic cell function.

Research and career 
Barners' research considers T cell immunology. She is focused on the translation of laboratory findings to clinical environments. Barnes worked as a Medical Research Council Senior Fellow at the University of Oxford, and eventually was appointed lead of herpetology in the Thames Valley. She studied why 80% of patients with hepatitis C get chronic infection. Barnes identified that the nature of the T cell response determines which pathway a patient goes down. This observation led Barnes to develop an T-cell vaccine to prevent hepatitis C infection. The vaccine is based on adenoviral vectors, which host the non-structural proteins of hepatitis C from a genotype 1B strain. There are seven major hepatitis C strains, which presents considerable challenges for the development of vaccines. Barnes was elected Fellow of the Academy of Medical Sciences in 2018.

During the COVID-19 pandemic, Barnes studied the design, effectiveness and implementation of the COVID-19 vaccine. She showed that patients who suffered from COVID-19 were likely to be impacted by liver problems.

Selected publications

Personal life 
Barnes is married with two children.

References 

Fellows of the Academy of Medical Sciences (United Kingdom)
British women scientists
British women academics
Academics of the University of Oxford
20th-century British medical doctors
21st-century British medical doctors
British women medical doctors
NIHR Senior Investigators
Hepatitis researchers
Year of birth missing (living people)
Living people